Cat City is a 1986 Hungarian animated comic science fiction film, directed by Béla Ternovszky and written by József Nepp. The title Cat City was used in the United States distribution. The film was selected as the Hungarian entry for the Best Foreign Language Film at the 59th Academy Awards, but it was not nominated.

Plot
The film opens with a Star Wars opening crawl, which explains the film's premise: In year 80 AM (Anno Mickey Mouse), the mice of Planet X are threatened by humiliation and total apocalypse. The well-organized, fully equipped gangs of evil cats are aiming for the total obliteration of mice, not caring for the old conventions between mice and cats. But in the last moment, when the mouse leaders are beginning to consider leaving the planet, a new hope rises...

The film is a parody of several famous feature films, mainly the James Bond series. It tells the story of a special agent who is sent to the city of "Pokyo" to obtain the secret plans of a machine which could save mouse society. Of course, the cats don't want this to happen, and send some rat gangsters to stop him, who don't always prove as efficient as they initially seem.

Sequel: Cat City 2: The Cat of Satan 
The film was made on a limited budget of about 3 million USD, with the characters drawn and animated by hand, while objects and backgrounds were derived from 3D models and computer simulation. The visual world of the film is said to be influenced by the Matrix trilogy and Sin City, but softened for a younger audience. The former working title of Cat City 2 was retained as the final subtitle: "Cat of Satan", which would be translated literally as "The Tabby of the Baskervilles" if translated into English in its original context. The project was led by the original Nepp and Ternovszky duo, who directed the first film.

The story of Cat City 2 centers around an investigative journalist named Stanley Mouse, who wants to find out about the legend of an ancient "cat tribe" lost in Africa. He finds them and much more, once again threatening the continued existence of mouse civilization. Special Agent Grabowsky will act to save the day, however. The events are supposed to take place some 20 years after the first episode, as one of the already leaked cells shows the titular Cat-Catcher mecha rusting away in a shelter, and a grown-up child of some character appears in the plot.

Premiering on December 20, 2007, by January 2008 it had made the Hungarian Box Office Top Ten for 6 consecutive weeks.

See also
 List of animated feature films
 Vuk, another famous Hungarian animated film
 List of submissions to the 59th Academy Awards for Best Foreign Language Film
 List of Hungarian submissions for the Academy Award for Best Foreign Language Film

References

External links
 
 
 
 
 
 
 
 
 
 Screenshots from the original film: 1, 2

Hungarian animated films
1986 films
Hungarian animated science fiction films
1986 animated films
Adult animated films
1980s Hungarian-language films
Mecha anime and manga
Animated films about cats
Animated films about mice